Patrick Kavanagh (born 10 November 1945) is an Irish former hurler. He enjoyed a 20-year club career, lining out with Rower–Inistioge, University College Dublin and Borris–Ileigh, and was also a member of the Kilkenny senior hurling team.

Career

Kavanagh first played hurling as a schoolboy with Good Counsel College in New Ross. He later studied at University College Dublin and won two Fitzgibbon Cup medals and a Dublin SHC title during his tenure there. Kavanagh began his club career by winning a Kilkenny JHC title with Rower-Inistioge in 1963 before later winning a Kilkenny SHC title in 1968. He subsequently transferred to the Borris–Ileigh club in Tipperary and ended his career by winning a Tipperary SHC medal in 1983.

Kavanagh first played for Kilkenny at minor level before later lining out with the under-21 team, however, his inter-county underage career ended without success. He eventually progressed onto the senior team and came on as a substitute for Claus Dunne when Kilkenny beat Cork in the 1969 All-Ireland final. Kavanagh was again listed amongst the substitutes for Kilkenny's defeat by Limerick in the 1973 All-Ireland final. He later won an All-Ireland IHC title.

Honours

University College Dublin
Fitzgibbon Cup: 1968, 1969
Dublin Senior Hurling Championship: 1968

Rower–Insitioge
Kilkenny Senior Hurling Championship: 1968
Kilkenny Junior Hurling Championship: 1963

Borris–Ileigh
Tipperary Senior Hurling Championship: 1981, 1983
North Tipperary Senior Hurling Championship: 1981, 1983

Kilkenny
All-Ireland Senior Hurling Championship: 1969
Leinster Senior Hurling Championship: 1969, 1973
All-Ireland Intermediate Hurling Championship: 1973
Leinster Intermediate Hurling Championship: 1973

References

1945 births
Living people
UCD hurlers
Rower-Inistioge hurlers
Borris-Ileigh hurlers
Kilkenny inter-county hurlers
All-Ireland Senior Hurling Championship winners